Burning Springs Complex, also known as the Rathbone and Karns Wells, is a national historic district located at Burning Springs, Wirt County, West Virginia. It encompasses one contributing building and three contributing sites.  It was historically viewed as the world's second great oil field, after the Drake Well in Pennsylvania.  However, more recent scholarship including the PBS documentary Burning Springs shows it predates the Drake Well by a number of years. During the American Civil War, it was destroyed by General William E. Jones on May 9, 1863.

It was listed on the National Register of Historic Places in 1971.

References

Industrial buildings and structures on the National Register of Historic Places in West Virginia
Historic districts in Wirt County, West Virginia
Buildings and structures in Wirt County, West Virginia
National Register of Historic Places in Wirt County, West Virginia
American Civil War sites in West Virginia
Wirt County, West Virginia, in the American Civil War
Oil fields of the United States
Historic districts on the National Register of Historic Places in West Virginia
Energy infrastructure on the National Register of Historic Places